Giovine may refer to:

 16130 Giovine, a main-belt asteroid
 Claudia Giovine, Italian tennis player
 Alfredo Giovine, Italian historian and  dialectologist